Ingebrigtsen is a surname of Norwegian origin. Notable people with the surname include:

Aldor Ingebrigtsen (1888–1952), Norwegian politician for the Labour Party
Anton Olai Normann Ingebrigtsen Djupvik or Anton Djupvik (1881–1951), Norwegian politician for the Liberal Party
Bill Ingebrigtsen (born 1952), Minnesota politician and a member of the Minnesota Senate
Christian Ingebrigtsen (born 1977), Norwegian singer-songwriter and musician, also part of the band A1
Dag Ingebrigtsen (born 1958), Norwegian musician who had his debut in 1977 with the group Subway Suck
Guri Ingebrigtsen (1952–2020), Norwegian politician for the Labour Party
Kåre Ingebrigtsen (born 1965), Norwegian former footballer
Mikael Ingebrigtsen (born 1996), Norwegian footballer
Odd Emil Ingebrigtsen (born 1964), Norwegian politician for the Conservative Party
Ole Ingebrigtsen Soelberg (1798–1874), Norwegian politician
Ole Nikolai Ingebrigtsen Strømme (1876–1936), Norwegian Minister of Social Affairs in 1933
Oscar Andreas Ingebrigtsen (1902–1979), Norwegian politician for the Labour Party
Roger Ingebrigtsen (born 1966), Norwegian politician for the Labour Party
Stein Ingebrigtsen (born 1945), Norwegian singer
Tommy Ingebrigtsen (born 1977), Norwegian former ski jumper
Ingebrigtsen family, Norwegian athletics family, including:
Filip Ingebrigtsen (born 1993)
Gjert Ingebrigtsen (born 1966)
Henrik Ingebrigtsen (born 1991)
Jakob Ingebrigtsen (born 2000)

See also
Ingebretsen